is a Japanese actor. He is known for his affinity for strange character roles, and he is best known internationally for playing L in the 2006 films Death Note, Death Note 2: The Last Name and L: Change the World in 2008, as well as voicing Gelus in the Death Note animated adaptation. He was cast to play lead character Toru Watanabe in the film adaptation of Haruki Murakami's novel Norwegian Wood, which was released in December 2010.

Personal life
On April 1, 2011, he married Koyuki Katō, who co-starred with him in Kamui Gaiden. The couple's first child was born in January 2012, and their second child was born in January 2013 in South Korea. In July 2015, the couple had their third child.

Filmography

Film

Television

Animation

Awards

References

External links 

 Horipro agency profile
 

1985 births
Living people
People from Mutsu, Aomori
Japanese male film actors
Japanese male television actors
Japanese male voice actors
Actors from Aomori Prefecture
Taiga drama lead actors
21st-century Japanese male actors